Glæsisvellir (Glittering Plains) was a location in Jotunheim in Norse mythology. It is mentioned in sources such as Bósa saga ok Herrauds and Hervarar saga.

Legend
In Glæsisvellir could be found a location called Ódáinsakr, or Údáinsakr (lit. "Deathless Acre", meaning the "Undying Lands"). Everyone who went there became healthy and young, and so no one ever died there. The Eireks saga víðförla is about a man who searched for and found Údáinsakr.

In the Hervarar saga, it is the kingdom of Gudmund and his son Höfund. Gudmund was a friendly jötunn who was popular in later sagas.

In Gesta Danorum, Saxo Grammaticus makes a reference to Odainsaker as the place where the Scanian governor Fialler retired after having been attacked by the Danish king Wiglek:

The Glæsisvellir and the Ódáinsakr have close counterparts in earlier motifs of Irish storytelling. Given the extremely close correspondence between the motif complex of the Glæsisvellir and the Ódáinsakr and Irish motifs, and given that the Irish sources pre-date the Norse sources (starting already in the late seventh century), it can be assumed that the Glæsisvellir and the Ódáinsakr are based on a borrowing of Irish motifs by Norse settlers of the Viking Age. While moving to Iceland, many of these settlers spent long periods of time in Britain and Ireland, which in some cases led to a reception of Irish motifs by the Norse.

See also
Elysian Fields
Shangri-la
Blessed Isle
Tír na nÓg
Glasir

References

Other sources
Egeler, Matthias (2019): 'Iceland and the Land of Women. The Norse Glæsisvellir and the Otherworld Islands of Early Irish literature'. In: Aisling Byrne and Victoria Flood (eds.). Crossing Borders in the Insular Middle Ages. Brepols, Turnhout, p. 227-247 

Tyrfing cycle
Locations in Norse mythology